Dębsko may refer to the following places:
Dębsko, Grodzisk Wielkopolski County in Greater Poland Voivodeship (west-central Poland)
Dębsko, Kalisz County in Greater Poland Voivodeship (west-central Poland)
Dębsko, Łódź Voivodeship (central Poland)
Dębsko, West Pomeranian Voivodeship (north-west Poland)